Arsinoe was a city of ancient Crete controlled by Lyctus according to the Stephanus of Byzantium. This town is believed to belong to the Hellenistic period. According to some scholars, it was adjacent to (and perhaps overlaying) the older city of Rhithymna, but this identification is not really certain.

The city was named after Arsinoe II of Egypt, sister and wife of Ptolemy Philadelphus. It was under Ptolemaic influence, along with Itanos city.

Berkelius supposes that an error had crept into the text, and that for  we should read . Its identification with Rhithymna was first proposed by Eckhel. Georges Le Rider in 1968 established from numismatic evidence that the city of Rithymna was refounded at some point in the 3rd century BCE as Arsinoe. The evidence entails similar series of coins with the names of each city as well as find spots for the Arsinoe coins being in the regions around Rithymna. The exact refoundation date is less sure but Le Rider puts it in the reign of Ptolemy Philometer.

Roger S. Bagnall notes that this may be the same Arsinoe that appears as a Cretan city in a Magnesian inscription (I. Magn. 21 8) of 200 BCE. Bagnall says that the city of Rithymna reverted to its original name by the time of the Delphic Theorodoktoi lists of the early 2nd century BCE. 

There remains a possibility of another place being the Arsinoe in Crete as per the testimony of Stephanus of Byzantium, noted in Le Rider's article. Getzel M. Cohen suggests some other possible locations.

References

Populated places in ancient Crete
Port settlements in ancient Crete
Hellenistic Crete
Former populated places in Greece
Ptolemaic colonies